Mary Palmer (1750 – 6 September 1820) was a member of the British gentry and by marriage of the Irish peerage.

Life
She was the eldest daughter of John Palmer (1708–1770) of Palmer House, Great Torrington, Devon, by his wife Mary Reynolds (1716–1794). John's wife Mary was an elder sister of the painter Sir Joshua Reynolds (1723–1792).

On 21 July 1792 she became the second wife of Murrough O'Brien, Earl of Inchiquin, who had been widowed in 1790. She was painted at least three times by her uncle Joshua and as the chief beneficiary of his will she was able to pay off her husband's debts, though they had no children.

References

1750 births
1820 deaths
Thomond